The sixth season of the Mexican sitcom Una familia de diez premiered on Las Estrellas on 5 September 2021, and concluded on 24 October 2021.

In this season, Plutarco returns home after living a surreal adventure, while Martina threatens to give birth at any moment. Don Justo will come to live with the Lopezes, making their lives impossible. Romualdo will return to reclaim his son and will try to take Martina far away. La Nena, meanwhile, gets a scholarship for Victoria and Justito at the private school where she works and the consequences will be terrible. Plutarco and Gaby will celebrate their anniversary and Plácido will receive devastating news that could affect the whole family.

Cast 
 Jorge Ortiz de Pinedo as Plácido López
 Eduardo Manzano as Don Arnoldo López
 Zully Keith as Renata González de López
 Carlos Ignacio as Carlos
 Andrea Torre as La Nena
 Mariana Botas as Martina López
 Moisés Iván Mora as Aldolfo
 Camila Rivas as Victoria
 Tadeo Bonavides as Justo "Justito" López
 María Fernanda García as Licha González
 Daniela Luján as Gaby del Valle de López
 Ricardo Margaleff as Plutarco López

Episodes

References 

2021 Mexican television seasons